Jonathan Martinez (born April 20, 1994) is an American professional mixed martial artist. Martinez currently competes in the bantamweight division for the  Ultimate Fighting Championship (UFC). As of March 13, 2023, he is #14 in the UFC bantamweight rankings.

Background
Martinez was born and grew up in California and moved with his family to Plainview, Texas, at the age of 13. At the age of 14, his father took him to Taekwondo class to learn discipline, which eventually led to mixed martial arts training.

Mixed martial arts career

Early career 
Martinez started his professional MMA career since 2014. He amassed a record of 9–1 prior to being signed by UFC.

Ultimate Fighting Championship
Martinez made his UFC debut on October 27, 2018 on UFC Fight Night: Volkan vs. Smith, replacing an injured Gavin Tucker against Andre Soukhamthath. After getting knocked down multiple times, Martinez lost the fight via unanimous decision.

Martinez's next fight came on February 9, 2019 at UFC 234 against Wuliji Buren. Martinez won the fight via unanimous decision.

Martinez faced Liu Pingyuan on July 13, 2019 at UFC Fight Night: de Randamie vs. Ladd. He won the fight via knockout in round three. This win earned him the Performance of the Night award.

As the last fight of his prevailing contract, Martinez faced Andre Ewell on February 8, 2020 at UFC 247. He lost the fight via split decision. Right after the bout, Martinez signed a new contract with the promotion.

Martinez faced Frankie Saenz on August 1, 2020 at UFC Fight Night: Brunson vs. Shahbazyan.  At the weigh-ins, Martinez weighed in at 140.5 pounds, four and a half pounds over the bantamweight non-title fight limit. His bout proceeded at a catchweight and he was fined 30 percent of his purse, which went to Saenz. After knocking Saenz down multiple times, Martinez won the fight via TKO in the third round.

Martinez faced Thomas Almeida on  October 18, 2020 at UFC Fight Night 180. He won the fight via unanimous decision.

Martinez faced Davey Grant on March 13, 2021 at UFC Fight Night 187. Despite knocking Grant down in the first round, Martinez ultimately lost the fight via knockout in round two.

Martinez was scheduled to face Nathaniel Wood on September 4, 2021 at UFC Fight Night 191. However, Wood was removed from the bout in mid-August for undisclosed reasons and replaced by Marcelo Rojo.  At the weigh-ins, Martinez weighed in at 138 pounds, two pounds over the bantamweight non-title fight limit. The bout was scrapped after Martinez withdrew due to complications from the weight cut.

Martinez was scheduled to face Aaron Phillips, replacing Kris Moutinho on October 23, 2021 at UFC Fight Night 196. However, Philips withdrew from the bout due to illness and was replaced by Zviad Lazishvili. Martinez won the fight via unanimous decision.

Martinez faced Alejandro Pérez on February 26, 2022 at UFC Fight Night 202. He won the fight via unanimous decision.

Martinez faced Vince Morales on May 21, 2022 at UFC Fight Night 206. He won the fight via unanimous decision.

Martinez faced Cub Swanson on October 15, 2022 at UFC Fight Night 212. He won the fight via technical knockout in round two. This win earned him the Performance of the Night award.

Martinez faced Said Nurmagomedov on March 11, 2023, at UFC Fight Night 221. He won the fight via unanimous decision. 13 out of 17 media outlets scored the bout as a victory for Nurmagomedov.

Personal life
Jonathan and his wife Amber have  a son Cidro and a daughter Myda.

Championships and awards
Ultimate Fighting Championship
Performance of the Night (Two times) 
Xtreme Fighting League
XFL Flyweight Championship (one time; former)
XFL Bantamweight Championship (one time; former)

Mixed martial arts record

|-->
|-
|Win
|align=center|18–4
|Said Nurmagomedov
|Decision (unanimous)
|UFC Fight Night: Yan vs. Dvalishvili
|
|align=center|3
|align=center|5:00
|Las Vegas, Nevada, United States
|-->
|-
|Win
|align=center|17–4
|Cub Swanson
|TKO (leg kick)
|UFC Fight Night: Grasso vs. Araújo
|
|align=center|2
|align=center|4:19
|Las Vegas, Nevada, United States
|
|-
|Win
|align=center|16–4
|Vince Morales
|Decision (unanimous)
|UFC Fight Night: Holm vs. Vieira
|
|align=center|3
|align=center|5:00
|Las Vegas, Nevada, United States
|
|-
|Win
|align=center|15–4
|Alejandro Pérez
|Decision (unanimous)
|UFC Fight Night: Makhachev vs. Green
|
|align=center|3
|align=center|5:00
|Las Vegas, Nevada, United States
|
|-
|Win
|align=center|14–4
|Zviad Lazishvili
|Decision (unanimous)
|UFC Fight Night: Costa vs. Vettori 
|
|align=center|3
|align=center|5:00
|Las Vegas, Nevada, United States
| 
|-
|Loss
|align=center|13–4
|Davey Grant
|KO (punch)
|UFC Fight Night: Edwards vs. Muhammad 
|
|align=center|2
|align=center|3:03
|Las Vegas, Nevada, United States
|
|-
|Win
|align=center|13–3
|Thomas Almeida
|Decision (unanimous)
|UFC Fight Night: Ortega vs. The Korean Zombie
|
|align=center|3
|align=center|5:00
|Abu Dhabi, United Arab Emirates
|
|-
|Win
|align=center|12–3
|Frankie Saenz
|TKO (knee and punches)
|UFC Fight Night: Brunson vs. Shahbazyan 
|
|align=center|3
|align=center|0:57
|Las Vegas, Nevada, United States
|
|-
|Loss
|align=center|11–3
|Andre Ewell
|Decision (split)
|UFC 247 
|
|align=center|3
|align=center|5:00
|Houston, Texas, United States
|
|-
|Win
|align=center| 11–2
|Liu Pingyuan
|KO (knee)
|UFC Fight Night: de Randamie vs. Ladd 
|
|align=center|3
|align=center|3:53
|Sacramento, California, United States
|
|-
|Win
|align=center| 10–2
|Wuliji Buren
|Decision (unanimous)
|UFC 234
|
|align=center|3
|align=center|5:00
|Melbourne, Australia
|
|-
|Loss
|align=center| 9–2
|Andre Soukhamthath
|Decision (unanimous)
|UFC Fight Night: Volkan vs. Smith
|
|align=center|3
|align=center|5:00
|Moncton, New Brunswick, Canada
|
|-
|Win
|align=center| 9–1
|Randy Hinds
|Submission (armbar)
|Fist Fight Night 2
|
|align=center|1
|align=center|0:56
|Amarillo, Texas, United States
|
|-
|Win
|align=center| 8–1
|Jesse Cruz
|Submission (armbar)
|Combate Americas: Road to the Championship 3
|
|align=center|1
|align=center|2:17
|Los Angeles, California, United States
|
|-
|Loss
|align=center| 7–1
|Matt Schnell
|DQ (illegal knee)
|Legacy FC 49
|
|align=center|2
|align=center|2:21
|Bossier City, Louisiana, United States
|
|-
|Win
|align=center| 7–0
|Ryan Hollis
|Decision (unanimous)
|GCS 3: Hub City Havoc
|
|align=center|3
|align=center|5:00
|Lubbock, Texas, United States
|
|-
|Win
|align=center| 6–0
|Carlos Vergara
|Decision (split)
|Fury Fighting 3
|
|align=center|3
|align=center|5:00
|San Antonio, Texas, United States
|
|-
|Win
|align=center| 5–0
|Xavier Siller
|TKO (punches)
|XFL: Rage on the River 5
|
|align=center|2
|align=center|1:03
|Grant, Oklahoma, United States
|
|-
|Win
|align=center| 4–0
|Adrian Hudson
|TKO (punches)
|XFL: Rage on the River 4
|
|align=center|5
|align=center|1:01
|Tulsa, Oklahoma, United States
|
|-
|Win
|align=center| 3–0
|Micah Stockton
|TKO (punches)
|XFL: Rage on the River 3
|
|align=center|3
|align=center|0:44
|Tulsa, Oklahoma, United States
|
|-
|Win
|align=center| 2–0
|Marshon Ball
|KO (flying knee)
|Rumble Time Promotions: Destruction
|
|align=center|1
|align=center|1:23
|St. Charles, Missouri, United States
|
|-
|Win
|align=center| 1–0
|Archie Lowe
|KO (flying knee)
|C3 Fights: Border Wars 2014
|
|align=center|2
|align=center|2:21
|Newkirk, Oklahoma, United States
|
|-

See also
List of current UFC fighters
List of female mixed martial artists

References

External links
 
 

Living people
1994 births
Bantamweight mixed martial artists
Mixed martial artists utilizing taekwondo
Mixed martial artists utilizing Brazilian jiu-jitsu
American practitioners of Brazilian jiu-jitsu
American male taekwondo practitioners
American male mixed martial artists
People from Plainview, Texas
Mixed martial artists from Texas
Ultimate Fighting Championship male fighters
American sportspeople of Mexican descent
American people of Salvadoran descent